"Dark Age" is a song by Australian blues group, The Hippos. The song was released in August 1988 as the second and final single from the group's debut studio album, Hippocracy. "Dark Age" peaked at 45 in Australia.

At the ARIA Music Awards of 1989, the song was nominated for three awards; ARIA Award for Breakthrough Artist – Single, ARIA Award for Producer of the Year (Les Karski & Guy Gray) and ARIA Award for Engineer of the Year (Guy Gray).

Track listing
 7" Single (7-258002)
 "Dark Age"	
 "Rodent Operative"

Charts

References

1988 singles
1988 songs